Mariana Duque Mariño was the defending champion, but she had retired from professional tennis earlier in the year. 

Whitney Osuigwe won the title, defeating Madison Brengle in the final, 6–4, 1–6, 6–3.

Seeds

Draw

Finals

Top half

Bottom half

References

Main Draw

Boar's Head Resort Women's Open - Singles